Darcy Verot (born July 13, 1976) is a Canadian former professional ice hockey forward.

Career 
Verot, undrafted, is a former professional hockey player of the National Hockey League. A veteran and fan favorite of the American Hockey League, he is one of the few professional players to ever work his way up to the NHL from the WPHL (Western Pacific Hockey League). He ended his career in the Kontinental Hockey League, of Russia, retiring in 2013. Originally signed as a free agent, in 2000, by the Pittsburgh Penguins, Verot made his NHL debut with the Washington Capitals, playing 37 games during the 2003–04 NHL season, before the first NHL lockout, in '04. Notoriously tough, Verot led all players in penalty minutes for the last half of the season.

In 2002, Verot played with the Calgary Flames organization before signing a two-way contract, in 2005, with the Columbus Blue Jackets - where he played as a letterman for two seasons with their American Hockey League affiliate, the Syracuse Crunch. In 2007, after sustaining, and recovering from, a serious shoulder injury Verot signed with Vityaz Chekhov of the highly competitive KHL and amassed more than 1000 penalty minutes over five years, playing for Vityaz.

In 2011, Verot signed with KHL's powerhouse team, the HC CSKA Moscow where he notably fought former teammate, and hockey star, Jaromír Jágr. 

While with Russia he was involved in multiple incidents, particularly in games against rival Avangard Omsk. Notably he fought star Jaromír Jágr (who was briefly his teammate in Washington) on a couple of occasions, losing each time. When Verot tried out for Czech Extraliga club Oceláři Třinec in 2011, Jágr, who owns another club in the league, expressed outrage.

Verot is married to the former Nicole Pizzolatto of Lake Charles, Louisiana and the couple have five children together.

References

External links

1976 births
Canadian ice hockey forwards
Lake Charles Ice Pirates players
Living people
People from Radville, Saskatchewan
Portland Pirates players
Saint John Flames players
Ice hockey people from Saskatchewan
Syracuse Crunch players
Undrafted National Hockey League players
HC Vityaz players
Washington Capitals players
Weyburn Red Wings players
Wheeling Nailers players
Wilkes-Barre/Scranton Penguins players
Canadian expatriate ice hockey players in Russia